Trevor John Cadieu is a retired senior Canadian military officer. He reached the rank of lieutenant general, and was slated to become army commander, but retired after allegations of sexual misconduct. In 2022, he travelled to Ukraine to join the fight against the 2022 Russian invasion of Ukraine.

Biography
Cadieu was born in Saskatchewan and raised in Vernon. He was commissioned in the Canadian military in 1995, deployed to Bosnia in 1997, deployed to Afghanistan in 2002 and 2006-7. In 2017 he was appointed commander of the 3rd Canadian Division. A ceremony to designate him Commander of the Canadian Army in September 2021 was cancelled at the last moment due to sexual misconduct complaint involving "historical allegations". The investigation was over 1994 events in the Royal Military College of Canada. A retired female officer complained she was raped when she was a cadet by two senior cadets, one of whom was Cadieu.

He was charged with two counts of sexual assault during June 2022.  After Cadieu was supported by serving military officers, sexual abuse survivors responded with anger.

War in Ukraine
In April 2022, he travelled to Ukraine, to join the fight against the 2022 Russian invasion of Ukraine. Russian sources often refer to him as Trevor Kadier. On 28 April, spokesperson Eduard Basurin, said he was one of as many 400 foreign fighters trapped in the Azovstal iron and steel works during the Siege of Mariupol operation.

Cadieu was not captured, but indicated in an email from Ukraine that he was "making arrangements to return to Canada" to face sexual assault charges.

Notelist

References

Year of birth missing (living people)
Living people
Lieutenant generals
Canadian Army officers
Ukrainian military personnel of the 2022 Russian invasion of Ukraine
Foreign volunteers in the 2022 Russian invasion of Ukraine